James Joseph Neylan (30 April 1885 – 5 July 1969) was an Australian rules footballer who played with Fitzroy and Carlton in the Victorian Football League (VFL).

Death
He died on 5 July 1969.

Notes

References

External links 
 
 
 Jim Neylan's profile at Blueseum
 Jim Neylan, at The VFA Project: note that the item has his family name as "Neylon".

1885 births
1969 deaths
Australian rules footballers from Melbourne
Fitzroy Football Club players
Carlton Football Club players
West Melbourne Football Club players
Footscray Football Club (VFA) players
People from Collingwood, Victoria